Grixona was a cargo airline based in Chișinău, Moldova. It operated international charter services to destinations in the Republic of Congo, India, Iraq, Kyrgyzstan, Pakistan, Somalia and the United Arab Emirates. Its main base was Chișinău International Airport.

History
The airline started operations on 29 April 2005 and had 125 employees (at March 2007).

In June 2007, the Republic of Moldova withdrew the airline's certificate on the grounds that the airline did not have appropriate safety oversight, and, as a consequence, the European Commission's Air Safety Commission banned the airline from flying within the European Union.

Fleet
The Grixona fleet included the following aircraft (at March 2007):
1 Antonov An-12B
1 Ilyushin Il-18D

External links
Grixona

References

Defunct airlines of Moldova
Airlines established in 2005
Airlines disestablished in 2007
2005 establishments in Moldova
2007 disestablishments in Moldova
Defunct cargo airlines
Cargo airlines of Moldova